Rzepinek  is a village in the administrative district of Gmina Rzepin, within Słubice County, Lubusz Voivodeship, in western Poland. 

The village has a population of 10.

References

Rzepinek